Matthew Margeson (born June 9, 1980) is an American composer, musician, and arranger of film, television, and video game scores. He is a member of Hans Zimmer's Remote Control Productions, and has been a frequent collaborator of fellow composer Henry Jackman on films like Kick-Ass 2, Kingsman: The Secret Service, and its sequel Kingsman: The Golden Circle.

Filmography

As main composer

As other

References

External links

1980 births
American film score composers
American male film score composers
American music arrangers
American television composers
Living people
Male television composers
Video game composers
Varèse Sarabande Records artists